Frank Edwin Lark (1887 – 21 March 1946) was a member of the New Zealand Legislative Council from 9 March 1936 to 8 March 1943; and 9 March 1943 to 21 March 1946. 
He was appointed by the First Labour Government.

Biography

Early life
He was originally from Plymouth, England, and joined the Royal Navy as a naval rating on HMS Encounter. He then left the service and went to northern Wairoa in 1932 and later moved to Waihi. He joined the Railway Department but left it about 1920 to go farming at Matamata.

Political career
While in Matamata, he took a keen interest in school and local government affairs, became a member of the school committee, and the chairman and also a member of the Matamata Town Board. He was an energetic worker on behalf of the unemployed. He was elected a member of the Auckland City Council in 1935, but declined to stand for re-election three years later. He was a member of the Auckland Transport Board, serving as deputy chairman for a period. In 1935 Lark was appointed to the Legislative Council.

Death
Lark died on 21 March 1946 and his ashes were buried at Waikumete Cemetery. He was survived by his wife May, two sons and one daughter.

References 

These notes were sourced from a eulogy from an Auckland newspaper published 21 March 1946.

1887 births
1946 deaths
Members of the New Zealand Legislative Council
New Zealand Labour Party MLCs
People from Matamata
English emigrants to New Zealand
Auckland City Councillors
Burials at Waikumete Cemetery
20th-century Royal Navy personnel
Military personnel from Plymouth, Devon
Royal Navy personnel of World War I